Rasmus på luffen is a 1981 Swedish film directed by Olle Hellbom, which was released to cinemas in Sweden on 12 December 1981. It is based on the 1955 film Luffaren och Rasmus by Astrid Lindgren, the book Rasmus på luffen by Lindgren was published in 1956.

Plot
The story is set in the year 1910 when a child, Rasmus, runs away from the orphanage Västerhaga and meets the tramp Oskar.

Selected cast
Allan Edwall as Oskar
Erik Lindgren as Rasmus
Jarl Kulle as Hilding Lif
Håkan Serner as Liander
Olof Bergström as Länsman (policeman)
Rolf Larsson as policeman Bergqvist
Roland Hedlund as policeman Andersson
Lena Brogren as Martina, Oskar's wife
Tommy Johnson as Nilsson
Lottie Ejebrant as Nilsson's wife
Lars Amble as merchant
Lena Nyman as merchant's wife
Georg Adelly as Lusknäpparn, tramp
Göran Graffman as Rosasco, tramp
Gösta Linderholm as Sju Attan, a tramp
Ulla-Britt Norrman-Olsson as the first woman visited by Oskar and Rasmus
Emy Storm as the principal of Västerhaga
Svea Holst as Lille-Sara
Bertil Norström as mayor
Pål Steen as Gunnar, child at Västerhaga
Fredrik Ljungdahl as child at Västerhaga
Stefan Delvin as child at Västerhaga
Jonas Karlsson as child at Västerhaga

About film
It was re-released on DVD on 5 November 2003.

This was the final film of director Hellbom, who died the next year.
Jn

References

External links

1981 films
Swedish children's films
Films based on works by Astrid Lindgren
Films set in 1910
Films directed by Olle Hellbom
Films scored by Björn Isfält
1980s Swedish films